Maryknoll Fathers' School is an aided (i.e. government funded) co-educational school in Tai Hang Tung, Kowloon, Hong Kong. The school was founded in 1957 by the Maryknoll Fathers and Brothers.

The school's medium of instruction is Cantonese for the primary section and English for the secondary section.

History
In 1952, Father Peter A. Reilly, an American Catholic priest of the Maryknoll Fathers and Brothers, came to Hong Kong as a missionary. He had been a missionary in Wuchow, Kwangsi for more than a decade, until he was forced to leave after the Communist Party of China came to power. When Father Reilly came to Hong Kong, he put up a small wooden hut in Kowloon Tsai, where he served the poor in that area, including many refugees from the People's Republic of China. He set aside a study room and hired teachers to educate the children of the area.

Father Reilly applied to the government for permission to build a subsidised school. In those days, the government began to focus on the provision of public services such as safe housing, medical care and education. The government granted permission not only for Father Reilly to build the primary school he had hoped for, but also to build a subsidised secondary school, the first of its kind in Hong Kong. To find students and teachers for the school, Father Reilly sought the help of Mrs. Tong Yu Sheung Woon, the headmistress of Yan Pak School. 

On 26 September 1957, the Right Reverend Bishop Lawrence Bianchi (the Bishop of Hong Kong) and Governor Sir Alexander Grantham presided over the official opening and blessing of the school. Father Reilly and Mrs. Tong became, respectively, the first supervisor and the first principal of the school.

Encouraged by initial successes and motivated by the need to provide education for the children in the district, the Maryknoll Fathers requested the Education Department for an expansion of the school by the acquisition of a site behind it. The request was approved. On 17 February 1966, the Right Reverend Bishop Frederick Donaghy (the Bishop of Wuchow) blessed the New Wing, which provided space for a library, twelve new classrooms, improved science facilities, and a large hall.

In 2008, the primary section moved to a new campus at 11 Hoi Lai Street, Sham Shui Po. From originally a half-day school (with A.M. and P.M. sections), it became a full-day school.

Father Reilly served as supervisor for the rest of his life. He passed away in St Teresa's Hospital in 1994. He was succeeded by Father John Geitner from 1995 to 2011, who in turn was succeeded by Father Michael Sloboda from 2011 to 2017. In 2017, Ms. Agnes Garman Yeh became the current supervisor.

Mrs. Tong Yu Sheung Woon passed away in November 2005 in Toronto, Canada, at the age of 94. Currently, the principal of the secondary school is Mr. Ho Lik Sang and the principal of the primary school is Mr. Ng Wai Man.

Achievements
In 2008, two students of the school, Lau Tak Kin and Lau Tak Shing (not related), were awarded second place in the Intel International Science and Engineering Fair (ISEF) for their invention of an "anti-bump lock" that could counter bump keys. Two minor planets (25065 and 25073) were named in their honour. In 2014, another student, Kan Wing Yi, was awarded second place in the Intel ISEF for her invention of biodegradable bandages. A minor planet (31313) was named in her honour.

Alumni Relations
The first official alumni unit is the Maryknoll Fathers' School Peer Counsellors Alumni (MFSPCA), established in 1996, which aims to maintain contacts for ex-peer counsellors and mentors of the student mentoring scheme held by the counselling department. The MFSPCA holds activities such as Christmas Snowball, summer outings and a pen-pal scheme for its members.

In 2005, Maryknoll Fathers' School Alumni Ltd, the official alumni unit for all graduates, was established. Currently the lifetime membership is HKD$1000, alternatively members can pay an annual fee of HKD$50. The alumni unit has a very active unofficial Vancouver chapter.

The annual Watermelon Cup, held just after final exam in the summer, is a famous activity for graduates to compete in with current MFS students.

References

External links

Maryknoll Fathers' School Official Website

Primary schools in Hong Kong
Secondary schools in Hong Kong
Maryknoll schools
Catholic secondary schools in Hong Kong
Shek Kip Mei
Educational institutions established in 1957
1957 establishments in Hong Kong